Sir John Harrison ( 1590 – 28 September 1669) of Balls Park, Hertfordshire was an English politician who sat in the House of Commons variously between 1640 and 1669. He supported the Royalist side in the English Civil War.

Public life
Harrison was born in Lancaster, the 12th son of a yeoman, and went to London in 1611 at the age of 22. He was one of the first to suggest the position of commissioner of the customs and was given that post.

Harrison was elected MP for Scarborough in 1628. In April 1640, he was elected Member of Parliament for Lancaster in the Short Parliament. He was then elected for Lancaster in November 1640 for the Long Parliament.

He built Balls Park House in Hertford between 1637 and 1640 and was knighted in 1641.

He supported the king during the Civil War and was disabled from sitting in September 1643. He suffered greatly from his loyalty, being fined £10,745. After the Restoration, Harrison was elected MP for Lancaster again in 1661 for the Cavalier Parliament and held the seat until his death in 1669. He served as a gentleman of the Privy Chamber from 1664 until his death.

Private life
Harrison died at the age of 80, at Balls Park, Hertford and was buried at All Saints' Church, Hertford.

He had married, firstly, Margaret Fanshawe, daughter of Robert Fanshawe, by whom he had three sons, all of whom predeceased him, and two daughters, and, secondly, Mary Shotbolt, daughter of Philip Shotbolt, by whom he had a son and a daughter. His elder daughter Ann by his first wife married Sir Richard Fanshawe, 1st Baronet ambassador to Spain. He was survived by his three daughters and his youngest son, the only son of his second marriage, Richard Harrison (1646–1726), who succeeded him at Balls Park and was also the Member of Parliament for Lancaster.

His descendants included Charles Townshend, 3rd Viscount Townshend and George Townshend, 1st Marquess Townshend.

References

 

1590s births
1669 deaths
People from Lancaster, Lancashire
Cavaliers
Oxford Parliaments
English MPs 1628–1629
English MPs 1640 (April)
English MPs 1640–1648
English MPs 1661–1679
Gentlemen of the Privy Chamber
Knights Bachelor